Lonchophyllinae is a subfamily of leaf-nosed bats.

List of species

Subfamily: Lonchophyllinae
 Tribe Lonchophyllini
Genus: Lionycteris
Chestnut long-tongued bat, Lionycteris spurrelli
Genus: Lonchophylla
Bokermann's nectar bat, Lonchophylla bokermanni
Chocoan long-tongued bat, Lonchophylla chocoana
Goldman's nectar bat, Lonchophylla concava
Dekeyser's nectar bat, Lonchophylla dekeyseri
Lonchophylla fornicata
Handley's nectar bat, Lonchophylla handleyi
Western nectar bat, Lonchophylla hesperia
Godman's nectar bat, Lonchophylla mordax
Orcés’s long-tongued bat, Lonchophylla orcesi
Lonchophylla orienticollina
Orange nectar bat, Lonchophylla robusta
Genus: Platalina
Long-snouted bat, Platalina genovensium
Genus: Xeronycteris
Vieira's long-tongued bat, Xeronycteris vieirai
 Tribe Hsunycterini
Genus: Hsunycteris
Cadena's long-tongued bat, Hsunycteris cadenai
Dashe's nectar bat, Hsunycteris dashe
Patton's long-tongued bat, Hsunycteris pattoni
Thomas's nectar bat, Hsunycteris thomasi

References

Phyllostomidae
Mammal subfamilies